Marjan Altiparmakovski (born 18 July 1991) is a Macedonian footballer who plays as a striker for Macedonian club Bregalnica Štip. He also has Croatian nationality.

Career
Altiparmakovski started his career with FK Pelister of Bitola. He signed a five-year deal with Skoda Xanthi on 5 July 2010, but departed the club in May 2013. He then returned to Macedonia and FK Pelister. In January 2014, Altiparmakovski agreed a contract with Paniliakos. Before the 2017 season, he joined Lithuanian A Lyga side Sūduva. Altiparmakovski signed for FK Sarajevo on 7 February 2018. He had a spell with Bulgarian club Pirin Blagoevgrad between September 2019 and April 2020, during which he struggled with injuries..On 16 July 2020, he joined Macedonian side Struga.

References

External links
 
 FK Rabotnički profile

1991 births
Living people
Macedonian footballers
Sportspeople from Bitola
Association football forwards
FK Pelister players
Xanthi F.C. players
Paniliakos F.C. players
FK Rabotnički players
NK Inter Zaprešić players
FK Sūduva Marijampolė players
FK Sarajevo players
KF Laçi players
OFC Pirin Blagoevgrad players
FC Struga players
Macedonian First Football League players
Super League Greece players
Football League (Greece) players
Croatian Football League players
A Lyga players
Premier League of Bosnia and Herzegovina players
Kategoria Superiore players
Second Professional Football League (Bulgaria) players
North Macedonia under-21 international footballers
North Macedonia youth international footballers
Macedonian expatriate footballers
Expatriate footballers in Greece
Macedonian expatriate sportspeople in Greece
Expatriate footballers in Croatia
Macedonian expatriate sportspeople in Croatia
Expatriate footballers in Lithuania
Macedonian expatriate sportspeople in Lithuania
Expatriate footballers in Bosnia and Herzegovina
Macedonian expatriate sportspeople in Bosnia and Herzegovina
Expatriate footballers in Albania
Macedonian expatriate sportspeople in Albania
Expatriate footballers in Bulgaria
Macedonian expatriate sportspeople in Bulgaria
Croatian people of Macedonian descent